The 2008 Fred Page Cup Playoffs of the British Columbia Hockey League began on February 29, 2008. The top two teams in each of the Coastal and Interior Conferences received a bye into the conference semifinals. The remaining eight teams that qualified, four from each conference, played a best-of-5 series elimination round. For the conference semifinals and finals, play reverted to a best-of-7 series.  The conference champions played a best-of-7 series for the Fred Page Cup.

Playoff seeds
After the 2007-08 BCHL season, 12 teams qualified for the playoffs. The Nanaimo Clippers were the Coastal Conference regular season champions and were also the BCHL regular season winners with the best record at 88 points.  The Penticton Vees earned the Interior Conference regular season crown with 86 points.

Coastal Conference
Nanaimo Clippers - Coastal Conference and BCHL regular season champion; 88 points
Langley Chiefs - 72 points
Surrey Eagles - 70 points
Burnaby Express - 69 points
Victoria Grizzlies - 68 points 
Powell River Kings - 63 points

Interior Conference
Penticton Vees - Interior Conference regular season champion; 86 points
Westside Warriors - 83 points
Salmon Arm Silverbacks - 80 points
Vernon Vipers - 76 points
Trail Smoke Eaters - 53 points 
Prince George Spruce Kings - 52 points

Playoff Bracket

In each round, the highest remaining seed in each conference is matched against the lowest remaining seed. The higher-seeded team is awarded home ice advantage, which gives them a maximum possible four games on their home ice, with the other team getting a maximum possible three. The opening elimination round follows a best-of-five 2-2-1 format. Each best-of-seven series follows a 2–2–1–1–1 format. This means that the higher-seeded team will have Games 1 and 2, plus 5 and 7 if necessary, played on their home ice, while the lower-seeded team will be at home for the other games. The format ensures that the team with home ice advantage will always have home ice for the "extra" game if there are an odd number of games in a series.

Statistical leaders

Points

Note: GP = Games played; G = Goals; A = Assists; Pts = Points; PIM = Penalty minutes

Leading goaltenders
Note: GP = Games played; TOI = Time on ice (minutes); W = Wins; L = Losses; T = Ties; GA = Goals against; SO = Shutouts; Sv% = Save percentage; GAA = Goals against average

Fred
British Columbia Hockey League